The TNT – Fortuna Meeting is an annual track and field combined events meeting which takes place at Sletiště Stadium in Kladno, Czech Republic in mid-June. The event, which features a men's decathlon and a women's heptathlon, attracted an audience of 5000 in its inaugural edition in 2007 and saw world record holder Roman Šebrle win the men's competition with a total of 8697 points – the best decathlon performance that year. In 2010 the meeting was given IAAF World Combined Events Challenge status by the International Association of Athletics Federations.

The meeting director is Zdeněk Lubenský, a former Czech pole vaulter. A junior decathlon competition was introduced in 2010 and it was won by Czech athlete Adam Sebastian Helcelet.

Editions

Records

Past medallists
Key:

Men

Women

References

External links

Official website
2015 IAAF report

 
Decathlon
Annual track and field meetings
Recurring sporting events established in 2007
World Athletics Combined Events Tour
Athletics competitions in the Czech Republic
Sport in Kladno